Eyebeam may refer to:

 Eye beam, an emission theory of sight
 Eyebeam (comic), a daily comic strip written and illustrated by Sam Hurt
 eyeBeam (software), a VoIP softphone developed by CounterPath Corporation
 Eyebeam (organization), a not-for-profit arts and technology center based in New York City
 I-beam, a beam with an I- or H-shaped cross-section